Kiss the Lie is the sixth full-length album by Candiria. The band began writing material for the album in 2005 and recorded it at Jupiter 4 Studios, a studio owned and operated by Ken and Steve Schalk, as well as Purple Light Studios, where the band had recorded in the past.  The album has been completed since 2006, but the label choose not to release Kiss the Lie due to the band's inability to tour in support of the new release.  The album finally was made available through online music stores eMusic and Napster on October 27, 2008, and shortly thereafter saw a release on iTunes.

The current digital version of the album is not mastered, as well as song titles being incorrect and Reflection Eleven appears twice on the album (incorrectly titled "That Which Consumes in its second appearance).  The band is currently working on resolving the issue and hope to have the digital copies fixed by mid January 2009.  It was also announced that there will be a vinyl release of 'Kiss the Lie', which will feature new artwork by Seldon Hunt, mastered tracks, corrected song titles, alternate endings to select songs and a bonus track.  The vinyl release will also contain a CD-R copy of the album in its final form.

Track listing
 "Icarus Syndrome" - 6:42
 "Sirens" - 4:15
 "Reflection Eleven" - 6:25
 "The Sleeper" - 5:52
 "Legion" - 5:59
 "Alicia" - 1:33
 "A Rose Dies in Eden" - 4:08
 "Genuine" - 5:45
 "Splinter" - 4:57
 "Ascend" - 3:36
 "Colby" - 2:23
 "That Which Consumes" - 6:31
Total length: 58:06

References 

2008 albums
Candiria albums